Wonsheim is an Ortsgemeinde – a municipality belonging to a Verbandsgemeinde, a kind of collective municipality – in the Alzey-Worms district in Rhineland-Palatinate, Germany.

Geography

Location 
As a winegrowing centre, Wonsheim lies in Germany's biggest winegrowing district, in the middle of the wine region of Rhenish Hesse. It belongs to the Verbandsgemeinde of Wöllstein, whose seat is in the like-named municipality.

Through the municipality flows the river Dunselbach.

History 
On 10 June 800, Wonsheim had its first documentary mention in a donation document from Fulda Abbey as Vuanesheim.

Politics

Municipal council 
The council is made up of 12 council members, who were elected at the municipal election held on 7 June 2009, and the honorary mayor as chairman.

The municipal election held on 7 June 2009 yielded the following results:

Coat of arms 
The municipality's arms might be described thus: Chapé, lozengy argent and azure, Or an orb banded and charged with a cross bottonnée gules both gemmed of the first and sable a lion rampant of the third armed, langued and crowned of the fourth.

Culture and sightseeing

Buildings 
Saint Lambert's Evangelical Church (Lambertuskirche)
Holy Cross Catholic Church (Heilig-Kreuz-Kirche)
Town Hall

Economy and infrastructure

Transport 
Wonsheim lies near Autobahnen A 61 and A 63.

References

External links 
Municipality’s official webpage 
Town's official webpage] 

Alzey-Worms